The 1990 Mercantile Credit Classic was the eleventh edition of the professional snooker tournament which took place from 2–13 January 1990 with ITV coverage beginning on the 6th. The tournament was played at the Norbreck Castle Hotel, Blackpool, Lancashire.

The semi-finals have been reduced to one session each of best of 11 frames and the final with two session with a best of 19 final. Steve James won his only ranking title beating Warren King of Australia 10–6 in a tournament of upsets which only 4 of the top 16 reaching their seeding places.

Main draw

Final

Century breaks
(Including qualifying rounds)

141, 104, 101  Steve James
126, 109  Tony Drago
121  Tommy Murphy
119  Dennis Taylor
117  Brian Morgan
116  John Virgo
113  Peter Francisco
111  Martin Clark
106  Steve Newbury
105  Wayne Jones
102  Cliff Thorburn
102  Jim Wych
100  Dene O'Kane

References

Classic (snooker)
Classic
Classic
Sport in Blackpool
Classic